The World Scout Emblem is the emblem of the World Organization of the Scout Movement and is worn by Scouts and Scouters around the world to indicate their membership.  Each national Scout organization determines the manner in which the emblem is worn.

Origins of the design

Lord Baden-Powell began awarding a brass badge in the shape of the fleur-de-lis arrowhead to army scouts whom he had trained while serving in India in 1897. He later issued a copper fleur-de-lis badge to all participants of the experimental camp on Brownsea Island in 1907.

Baden-Powell included a design for the Scout's badge in his work, Scouting for Boys, which was a simple fleur-de-lis with the motto "Be Prepared" on a scroll below it. He reasoned that the fleur-de-lis was commonly used as the symbol for north on maps, and a Boy Scout was to show the way in doing his duty and helping others.

The plumes of the fleur-de-lis became symbols for Service to Others, Duty to God, and Obedience to the Scout Law. These three principles form the Scout Promise which is made by new Scouts as they join the movement. The fleur-de-lis was modified shortly after, to include the two five-pointed stars, which symbolize knowledge and truth. A "bond" was also added tying the three plumes together to symbolize the family of Scouting.

J. S. Wilson introduced an international Scout badge in 1939-a silver fleur-de-lis on a purple background surrounded by the names of the five continents in silver within a circular frame. The wearing of it was not universal, but was confined to past and present members of the International Committee and staff of the Bureau. A flag of similar design followed, the flying of which was restricted to international Scout gatherings.

The current emblem design was introduced at the 8th World Scout Jamboree in 1955 by former Boy Scouts of Greece National Commissioner Demetrios Alexatos.  The final design which is now worn on the uniforms of Scouts around the world includes a rope which encircles the fleur-de-lis and is tied in a reef knot at the bottom of the badge. The rope is there to symbolize the family of the World Scout Movement and the knot symbolizes the strength of the unity of the World Scout Movement. The colors chosen have heraldic significance, with the white of the arrowhead and rope representing purity, and the royal purple denoting leadership and service.

The use of the fleur-de-lis has led to some controversy, with critics citing its military symbolism. However, Robert Baden-Powell himself denied this link, writing and speaking about the various other meanings of the symbol.

Organization usage
Several of the national Scout organizations use the emblem in various ways.

The Scout Association
The Scout Association refers to the emblem as the World Membership Badge.  It is used as the joining award for each section—Beavers, Cubs, Scouts, Explorer Scouts and Scout Network—with requirements intended to help the Scout understand their commitment to Scouting.

Boy Scouts of America
The Boy Scouts of America (BSA) refers to the emblem as the World Crest; it may be worn on the uniform as an emblem of worldwide Scouting.  The BSA first used the badge as an award for Scouts and Scouters who participated in an international Scouting event from early 1956 through 1991; requirements were devised by each council.  In 1991, the BSA made it part of the uniform for all Scouts and the International Activity Patch replaced the World Scout Crest as an award.

Scouts South Africa
Scouts South Africa uses this badge when new members join, either as a Cub, a Scout or an Adult Leader. The badge is worn on the left front pocket of the uniform, over the heart. The five-pointed stars of the fleur-de-lis are often explained to be symbolic of the ten points of the Scout Promise.

References

Further reading

World Organization of the Scout Movement
Scouting uniform